Alkmaar railway station serves the town of Alkmaar, Netherlands. The station opened on 20 December 1865 and is located on the Den Helder–Amsterdam railway. The train services are operated by Nederlandse Spoorwegen and it is an Intercity station, where all trains stop.

History

Alkmaar Station opened on 20 December 1865 when the railway opened between Alkmaar and Den Helder. This was the second railway opened by the Hollandsche IJzeren Spoorweg-Maatschappij after the Amsterdam–Rotterdam railway. The line through Alkmaar was on the Staatslijn K railway, built by the Dutch state between 1865 and 1878.

The station building is a standard station building of the State Railways of the 1860s The three other remaining station buildings of this style are in Harlingen, Leeuwarden and Winschoten. The station building of Alkmaar was expanded in 1879 and in 1908, by which time the entire building had two floors. A small extension was made on the south side of the station, making it asymmetrical. Following the middle part of the building was expanded forwards. In 1929 the north side of the station building was extended. In the 1960s the station entrance was altered, the hall of the station gained a glass front.

The railway line from Amsterdam to Alkmaar was electrified in 1931. The line to Den Helder was electrified in 1958 and the line to Hoorn in 1974. Behind the platforms are 7 sidings, where trains are stabled between peak hours and at night.

Between 2014 and 2016 the north side of the station area was altered significantly. A new bridge has been built over the tracks which will connect the Bergerhof area and the station better. The tunnel under the platforms was closed as a result.

Train services
The station is served by the following services:

2x per hour Intercity services (Schagen -) Alkmaar - Amsterdam - Utrecht - Eindhoven - Maastricht (not after 20:00 or on Sundays, operates to Schagen during peak hours)
2x per hour Intercity services Den Helder - Amsterdam - Utrecht - Arnhem - Nijmegen
2x per hour Intercity services Alkmaar - Haarlem (only on weekdays peak hours in the peak direction)
2x per hour Local services (Sprinter) Hoorn - Alkmaar - Uitgeest - Haarlem - Amsterdam

A night Sprinter service operates on the route between Amsterdam – Uitgeest – Alkmaar – Den Helder.

Bus services
There is a bus station at the front of the station where the following bus services regularly depart from. All bus services are operated by Connexxion, except 350 and 351 which is operated by Arriva.

 1 – Station - Centre - MCA Hospital - De Hoef - Station
 2 – Daalmeer - De Mare - Station - MCA Hospital - Overdie
 3 – Daalmeer - De Mare - Noord Station - Station
 4 – Daalmeer - Koedijk - De Mare - Vroonermeer - Noord Station - Station - Centre - MCA Hospital - Overdie
 5 – Station - De Hoef/Van Goghlaan - MCA Hospital - Centre - Station
 6 – (Bergen aan Zee -) Bergen - Alkmaar INHolland University - Station - Heerhugowaard Reigersdaal
 8 – Station - Noord Station - Beverkoog
 9 – Station - Oudorp - St.Pancras - Langedijk - Scharwoude - Oudkarspel
 123 – Alkmaar - Oudorp - West-Grafdijk - De Rijp
 129 – Alkmaar - Stompetoren - Schermerhorn - Noordbeemster - Middenbeemster - Purmerend
 150 – Alkmaar - Heerhugowaard - Nieuwe Niedorp - Schagen
 151 – Alkmaar - Koedijk - Groet - Petten - Julianadorp
 157 – Alkmaar - Koedijk - Schoorldam - Warmenhuizen - Tuitjenhorn - Kalverdijk - Dirkshorn - Schagen
 160 – Alkmaar - Heerhugowaard
 163 – Alkmaar - MCA Hospital - Akersloot – Uitgeest
 165 – Alkmaar - Egmond aan Zee
 167 – Alkmaar Station - MCA Hospital - Castricum - (Beverwijk)
 350 – Alkmaar - Heerhugowaard - Wieringenwerf - Den Oever - Afsluitdijk - Bolsward - Leeuwarden
 351 - Alkmaar - Harlingen
 N60 – Alkmaar - Heerhugowaard Weekend Night bus
 N69 – Alkmaar - Amsterdam Saturday Night bus

References

NS website 
Dutch public transport travel planner 

Railway stations in North Holland
Railway stations opened in 1865
Railway stations on the Staatslijn K